Saumane is the name or part of the name of several communes in France:

 Saumane, in the Alpes-de-Haute-Provence department
 Saumane, in the Gard department
 Saumane-de-Vaucluse, in the Vaucluse department

oc:Las Salas de Gardon